The Russian Volleyball Federation ( in Russian: Всероссийская федерация волейбола, Vserossijskaja Federacija Volejbola hence the acronym Latinized VFV or in Russian ВФВ) is the governing body of volleyball in Russia; although existing since 1991, it is the prosecutor of the pre-existing Soviet volleyball federation (Федерация волейбола СССР, Federacija Volejbola SSSR).

It organizes the men's and women's volleyball championships in Russia as well as the activities of the men's and women's national teams of Russia.

In response to the 2022 Russian invasion of Ukraine, the International Volleyball Federation suspended all Russian national teams, clubs, and officials, as well as beach and snow volleyball athletes, from all events, and stripped Russia of the right to host the 2022 FIVB Volleyball Men's World Championship in August 2022, and will relocate games that were to be in Russia in June and July. The European Volleyball Confederation (CEV) also banned all Russian national teams, clubs, and officials from participating in European competition, and suspended all members of Russia from their respective functions in CEV organs. It also canceled all competitions in Russia.

History (Russia and Soviet Union)
Volleyball appeared in Russia in 1914 in Kazan and Nizhny Novgorod, where it was promoted by American instructors. In 1915, they got acquainted with volleyball in Khabarovsk and Vladivostok. In 1922, the first organizations that began to cultivate the new game in Moscow were Vsevobuch, theater studios, and student societies.

The official date of birth of Soviet volleyball is considered to be July 28, 1923, when a match between the men's teams of the Higher Art and Theater Workshops (VKHUTEMAS) and the State School of Cinematography (VKHUTEMAS) took place in Moscow with official arbitration. The sleight-of-hand section of the All-Union Physical Culture Council (VSFC) was involved in the development of volleyball.

From the mid-1920s, volleyball teams began to appear in Kharkov, Baku, Tbilisi, Grozny, and Leningrad.

Since 1927, official competitions for the city championship began to be held in Moscow.

Of great importance for the further development of volleyball in the USSR was its inclusion in the program of the 1928 All-Union Spartakiad. Preparation for these competitions took place throughout the country. Qualifying tournaments were held in Moscow, Kharkov, and Tbilisi. The main competitions took place in Moscow. The Ukrainian team won the men's tournament, the Moscow team won the women's tournament.

After the All-Union Spartakiad, the popularity of volleyball began to grow rapidly. In volleyball centers such as Moscow, Leningrad, Kharkov, the number of teams ran into many dozens. The geography of the game has also expanded significantly. Sections and teams began to appear in many cities of Russia, Ukraine, Belarus, Transcaucasia, and Central Asia. Numerous tournaments were held between the national teams of the cities and many exhibition matches.

In 1932, the All-Union Volleyball Section (since 1959, the USSR Volleyball Federation) was formed as an independent structure within the VSFC. Alexander Abramovich Potashnik was elected its first president.

The popularity of volleyball in the country was constantly growing, and there was a need for a new type of competition. In April 1933, the All-Union Volleyball Festival was held in Dnepropetrovsk, involving teams from all volleyball centers in the country. The combined men's and women's teams from Moscow became the winners of the tournament. In terms of their importance, these competitions were already actually the USSR championship. Therefore, it is customary to calculate the serial numbers of the All-Union championships, beginning in 1933.

Since 1938, the USSR championships began to be held between club teams. The first winners of such competitions were "Spartak" (Leningrad) for men and "Spartak" (Moscow) for women.

In 1947, Soviet volleyball entered the international arena. In August in Prague (Czechoslovakia) at the 1st World Festival of Youth and Students, the men's team from Leningrad (reinforced by the volleyball players from Moscow) won a landslide victory in the tournament. In October of the same year, Dynamo Moscow (reinforced by players from other Moscow clubs) beat all their rivals during a tour of Poland.

In 1948, the All-Union Volleyball Section was admitted to the FIVB.

In September 1949, in Prague (Czechoslovakia), the USSR women's team competed in the First European Championship, and the men's team competed in the First World Championship. Both teams became winners of the competition.

In 1950, the first USSR Cup was held. The men's and women's teams of Dynamo (Moscow) became the owners of the new honorary trophy.

In October 1950, in Sofia (Bulgaria), the men's team competed for the first time in the European Championship and won it.

In August 1952 in Moscow, the USSR women's national team made its World Championship debut and became the winner of the competition.

In 1956, the 1st Summer Spartakiad of the Peoples of the USSR was held in Moscow, the winners of which the volleyball competitions were the Ukrainian men's national team and the Moscow women's team. These competitions were also the USSR championship. Volleyball was invariably present in all subsequent Spartakiads.

In 1960, the volleyball European Champions Cup was played for the first time between men's club teams, which was won by the CSKA team. A similar women's tournament was held in 1961 and the Soviet team Dynamo (Moscow) also became its winner.

In 1964, volleyball competitions were held in Tokyo (Japan) for the first time on the program of the Olympic Games. The USSR men's national team became the winner, and the women's team took second place.

A year later, for the first time in Poland, the World Cup was played between men's teams, which was won by the USSR team.

In 1966, the USSR national teams debuted at the European Championships among youth teams. Both the men's and women's teams became champions.

In 1973, for the first time, CEV held a cup competition for club teams, the winners of which were volleyball players from the Zvezda (Voroshilovgrad) team and athletes from CSKA.

In 1977, the USSR national teams made their debut at the World Junior Championships. The men's team became the champion.

In the 1990/1991 season, under the auspices of the USSR Volleyball Federation, the last USSR championship and the USSR Cup took place, and in the 1992 Olympics season, the already open championships were played. Russia for women's teams and the CIS for men. 

In 1991, the All-Russian Volleyball Federation was formed. Valentin Vasilyevich Zhukov, who held this position until 2004, was elected president.

On October 1, 1992, the USSR Volleyball Federation ceased to be a member of the FIVB and CEV. The volleyball federations of Russia, Ukraine, Belarus, and other former Soviet republics became members of these international organizations.

Presidents of the USSR Volleyball Federation
1932-1949 — Potashnik, Alexander Abramovich 
1949-1950 — Anikin, Alexander Sergeevich
1952-1967 — Savvin, Vladímir Ivánovich
1967-1969 — Baltadzhi, Vladímir Grigorievich
1970-1971 — Parfenov, Yuri Alexandrovich
1971-1975 — Savvin, Vladímir Ivánovich
1976-1980 — Shashkov, Nikolai Alexandrovich
1980-1989 — Torshilov, Yuri Vasilievich
1989-1992 — Shibaev, Gennady Nikolaevich

Presidents of the All-Russian Volleyball Federation
1991-2004 — Zhukov, Valentin Vasilievich
2004-2009 — Patrushev, Nikolái Platonovich
since 2010 — Shevchenko, Stanislav Vladímirovich (in 2009-2010 — acting president)

Structure
The supreme body of the All-Russian Volleyball Federation is the Conference, which can have the status of report and election (which is held once every 4 years for the election of the leadership of the federation) and extraordinary (to resolve other issues). The last 13th information and election conference was held in December 2008 in Moscow.

In order to resolve the tasks set by the Conference for the RVF, as well as the statutory requirements, the conference delegates elect the Presidium for a period of 4 years. From among its members, the Presidium elects the Executive Committee, which implements the decisions of the Conference and the RVF Presidium and also organizes the day-to-day activities of the federation. Its work is headed by the President of the All-Russian Volleyball Federation, elected by the Conference for a term of 4 years. In addition to the President, the Executive Committee is made up of the RVF First Vice President, Vice Presidents, Secretary General, Director General, and other members.

To solve the special tasks facing the RVF, permanent technical commissions and councils have been created in its structure: an international commission, a commission for the logistics of competitions and the training process, a beach volleyball council, and a council of veterans. In addition, the structure of the VFV includes the All-Russian College of Judges and the Commission for Arbitration and Control and Audit elected at the conference.

The All-Russian Volleyball Federation includes 83 volleyball federations from Moscow, Saint Petersburg, Sevastopol, republics, territories, regions, and districts of the Russian Federation. In addition, 4 associations of regional volleyball federations (ARFV) have been formed: the Far East, Central Russia, Siberia, and the Urals.

List of regional volleyball federations included in the RVF structure

Leadership

Executive Committee
Shevchenko, Stanislav Vladimirovich — RVF President
Yaremenko, Alexander Mikhailovich — RVF General Secretary
Gorbenko, Andrey Vladimirovich — RVF Vice president, RVF Director General
Karpol, Nikolai Vasilyevich — RVF Vice president
Shipulin, Gennady Yakovlevich — RVF Vice president
Patkin, Vladimir Leonidovich — RVF Executive Director
Zhukov, Valentin Vasilievich — RVF Honorary President
Titov, Sergey Valerievich 
Trifonova, Zoya Alekseevna
Fadeev, Vladislav Valerievich
Yuriev, Yuri Nikolaevich — RVF President of the Arbitration

Sponsors
VTB Bank is the sponsor of the RVF, the general sponsor of the Russia men's national volleyball team.
VEB.RF is the sponsor of the RVF, the general sponsor of the Russia women's national volleyball team.

Oficial Tournaments
As part of its activities, the All-Russian Volleyball Federation is responsible for holding the following annual tournaments:
Russian Championship — men and women
Russian Cup — men and women
Russian Super Cup — men and women
Russian Championship — boys and girls
All Russia competitions — veterans
Beach Volley competitions

See also
Russia men's national volleyball team
Russia women's national volleyball team

References

External links
Официальный сайт ВФВ

Volleyball in Russia
Russia
Volleyball